Sir Basil Scott (1859 - 1926) was the Chief Justice of the Bombay High Court.

Early life
Sir  Basil Scott was the son of Henry Scott educated at Balliol College, Oxford. He passed B.A. in 1882 and M.A. in 1886. He was called to Bar Inner Temple and came out as a barrister to practice in the Bombay High Court in 1884.

Career

Scott's uncle Basil Lang, was the Advocate General and leading in practitioner of the Bombay High Court. Scott became acting Advocate-General in 1899 and was also appointed permanent Advocate-General of Bombay. In 1906 he was elevated as Puisne Judge and after retirement of Sir Lawrence Hugh Jenkins, he was appointed to the post of Chief Justice in 1908. It is known that some of his decisions were reversed by the Privy Council and he had to some extent, the prevailing prejudices of the Anglo-Indians of his time  Scott was the member of the Rowlatt Commission and also the head of Special Tribunal under the Special Tribunal Act in 1910 to deal with the case against Vinayak Damodar Savarkar.

References

1859 births
1926 deaths
Knights Bachelor
British India judges
20th-century English judges
Chief Justices of the Bombay High Court